The 1976–77 season of the European Cup football club tournament was won for the first time by Liverpool in the final against Borussia Mönchengladbach. Three-time defending champions Bayern Munich were knocked out by Dynamo Kyiv in the quarter-finals. It was only the second time an English side won the tournament, but it started a run of six consecutive wins by English clubs and an eight-year run during which the trophy was won by English clubs on seven occasions. Including this one, Liverpool reached five finals in nine years, of which they won four.

Bracket

First round

|}

First leg

Second leg

Zürich won 2–1 on aggregate.

2–2 on aggregate; TPS won on away goals.

Ferencváros won 11–3 on aggregate.

Dynamo Dresden won 2–0 on aggregate.

Saint-Étienne won 1–0 on aggregate.

PSV won 7–1 on aggregate.

Trabzonspor won 6–3 on aggregate.

Liverpool won 7–0 on aggregate.

Baník Ostrava won 3–2 on aggregate.

Bayern Munich won 7–1 on aggregate.

Dynamo Kyiv won 5–0 on aggregate.

PAOK won 3–1 on aggregate.

Torino won 3–2 on aggregate.

Borussia Mönchengladbach won 3–1 on aggregate.

Real Madrid won 3–1 on aggregate.

Club Brugge won 3–2 on aggregate.

Second round

|}

First leg

Second leg

Zürich won 3–0 on aggregate.

Dynamo Dresden won 4–1 on aggregate.

Saint-Étienne won 1–0 on aggregate.

Liverpool won 3–1 on aggregate.

Bayern Munich won 6–2 on aggregate.

Dynamo Kyiv won 6–0 on aggregate.

Borussia Mönchengladbach won 2–1 on aggregate.

Club Brugge won 2–0 on aggregate.

Quarter-finals

|}

First leg

Second leg

4–4 on aggregate; Zürich won on away goals.

Liverpool won 3–2 on aggregate.

Dynamo Kyiv won 2–1 on aggregate.

Borussia Mönchengladbach won 3–2 on aggregate.

Semi-finals

|}

First leg

Second leg

Liverpool won 6–1 on aggregate.

Borussia Mönchengladbach won 2–1 on aggregate.

Final

Top scorers

Notes

References

External links
1976–77 All matches – season at UEFA website
 European Cup results at Rec.Sport.Soccer Statistics Foundation
 All scorers 1976–77 European Cup according to protocols UEFA
1976-77 European Cup - results and line-ups (archive)

1976–77 in European football
European Champion Clubs' Cup seasons